Antonella is a Danish, Italian, Norwegian, Spanish and Swedish given name that is a diminutive form of Antonia and the feminine form of Antonello used in various regions of the United States, throughout Mexico, Central America, Spanish speaking countries in South America, Spain, Italy, Greenland, Sweden, Denmark, San Marino and Norway. and may refer to:

People 
Antonella Alonso (born 1990), Venezuelan pornographic actress.
Antonella Anedda (born 1955), Italian writer
Antonella Attili (born 1963), Italian actress
Antonella Baldini (born 1966), Italian voice actress
Antonella Barba (born 1986), American singer
Antonella Bellutti (born 1968), Italian cyclist
Antonella Benedettini, Sammarinese ambassador 
Antonella Bevilacqua (born 1971), Italian high jumper
Antonella Bizioli (born 1957), Italian marathoner
Antonella Bogarín (born 1991), Argentine swimmer
Antonella Bortolozzi (born 1986), Argentine volleyball player
Antonella Bragaglia (born 1973), Italian volleyball player
Antonella Cannarozzi, Italian costume designer
Antonella Cappuccio (born 1944), Italian artist
Antonella Capriotti (born 1962), Italian long jumper and triple jumper
Antonella Carta (born 1967), Italian footballer
Antonella Clerici (born 1962), Italian television host and journalist
Antonella Confortola (married name Wyatt, born 1975), Italian cross-country skier and mountain runner.
Antonella Corazza (born 1965), Italian rower
Antonella Costa (born 1980), Argentine actress
Antonella De Santo, Italian physicist
Antonella Del Core (born 1980), Italian volleyball player
Antonella Elia (born 1963), Italian entertainer
Antonella Falcione (born 1991), Argentine squash player
Antonella Frontani (born 1964), Italian journalist and writer
Antonella Gambino (born 1990), Argentinian handball player
Antonella Gambotto-Burke (née Antonella Gambotto, born 1965), Italian-Australian author and journalist
Antonella Grassi, American mathematician
Antonella Interlenghi (born 1960), Italian actress, also known as Antonellina Interlenghi
Antonella Kerr, Marchioness of Lothian, also known as Tony Lothian, (born Antonella Reuss Newland; 1922 – 2007), Italian-born British aristocrat
Antonella Lualdi (born 1931), Italian actress and singer
Antonella Mosetti (born 1975), Italian entertainer
Antonella Mularoni (born 1961), Sammarinese politician
Antonella Palmisano (born 1991), Italian female racewalker
Antonella Ponce (born 1997), Ecuadorian entertainer
Antonella Ponziani (born 1964), Italian actress
Antonella Ragno-Lonzi (born 1940), Italian fencer 
Antonella Rebuzzi (1954 – 2018), Italian politician
Antonella Rinaldi (born 1954), Italian actress
Antonella Ríos (born 1974), Chilean actress
Antonella Roncelli (born 1959), Italian swimmer
Antonella Ruggiero (born 1952), Italian singer
Antonella Salvucci (born 1981), Italian model, journalist, TV personality, and actress.
Antonella Scanavino (born 1992), Uruguayan swimmer
Antonella Sorace, linguist
Antonietta Stefanini, best known as Antonella Steni, (1926 – 2016), Italian actress
Antonella Terenzi (born 1965), Italian synchronized swimmer
Antonella Tosti, Italian physician and scientist
Antonella Valentini, (born 1958), Italian former swimmer
Antonella Colonna Vilasi, Italian historian
Antonella Serra Zanetti (born 1980), Italian tennis player

See also

Antonela
Antonella (TV series), Argentine Telenovela
Antonelli
Antonello (name)

References

Feminine given names
Danish feminine given names
Italian feminine given names
Norwegian feminine given names
Spanish feminine given names
Swedish feminine given names
Sammarinese given names